Reggie Sears (born April 12, 1991) is an American recording artist, vocalist, multi-instrumentalist musician and record producer, and a former child prodigy guitarist known for his songs "Dirty Dancer", "Dip My Dipper", and "You Betrayed Me".

Early life
Born in Fort Lauderdale, Florida, United States, Sears is the son of an African-American/Native American mother and a Caucasian father and was raised in a lower-income area in Fort Lauderdale's inner-city.

Sears was inspired to sing and play guitar after receiving a copy of Phil Thornalley's Swamp album at age four. He asked for a guitar at age five and the following Christmas he received one but his interest soon shifted to drums and he began playing drums after his parents bought him a drum set when he was eight. Inspired by blues artists, notably Buddy Guy, B.B. King, Stevie Ray Vaughan and Lightnin' Hopkins as well as the soul, rock and funk music his parents would play, he got started after his father purchased for him a Lonnie Mack CD and he began taking guitar seriously at age 11 after a cousin turned him onto Jimi Hendrix. At age 12, Sears asked his father to take him to an open-mic at a local club and Sears began gaining recognition as a young blues guitarist. Sears began sitting in with local bands and soon began appearing with Hubert Sumlin, Ronnie Baker Brooks (once referring to Sears as a "young Rico Suave"), Guitar Shorty, Bob Margolin, Chris Beard, Ana Popovic, Michael Burks, G. Love and Special Sauce, Fruteland Jackson, Lil' Ed Williams, Charlie Musselwhite, Bobby Rush, Inner Circle, Henry Gray, John Primer, Jimmy "Bo" Horne, Pinetop Perkins, backed up The Temptations, and even appeared with Rock and Roll Hall of Fame inductee Solomon Burke who dubbed Sears "the future [of Soul and Blues]" and referred to him as "godson". Within a few months he was playing professionally. 
In early 2004 Sears assembled a band of veteran musicians and he began booking shows at local clubs and festivals on the weekends and developed a loyal fan base and attracted the attention of several independent labels.

Career

Debut album: Transitions
Sears national debut album Transitions, a jazz-rock influenced collection of classic and obscure blues covers was released in September 2005. Sears enrolled in virtual school so that he could play music full-time. He began touring in support of Transitions, which led to appearances at notable venues such as Sarasota Blues Fest in Sarasota, Florida; Skippers Smokehouse in Tampa, Florida, and slowly built his way to headlining or co-headlining appearances at House of Blues in Orlando, Florida, on The Waterfront in Rockford, Illinois, and Cultural Fest in Las Vegas. His second CD, Blues Power, was released in fall of 2006. Looking to expand his musical horizons, Sears taught himself how to play over 20 instruments and learned the technical side of music production.

Southern Soul, Florida Style

In late 2006, Sears moved to the Southern soul genre with the release of his third album, Southern Soul, Florida Style, a collection of blues and Southern soul songs that gained little exposure or radio play despite the lead single "Back That Thang Up" finding its way on some radio playlists and club reports. Sears slowly built a strong fan base in the Southern soul market by tirelessly touring the south's Chitlin circuit of rural juke joints, ghetto bars, and blues festivals. Despite his often suggestive lyrics and racy concert performances which was deemed too explicit for commercial audiences, he became an underground success across the South and audiences, especially female ones, flocked to see Sears in concert.  
His fourth album was released in mid-2007 with the lead single "Dip My Dipper" faring well. In 2007, he served as musical director and lead guitarist for Miami soul singer David Hudson as well as guitarist/bassist and musical director for The Soul Generals while recording his fifth CD, his would-be major label debut Sweet Thang, which was ultimately shelved in 2009 and remains unreleased. By the end of the year Sears went on hiatus from music at age 16 after personal problems arose. After a bout of depression and an attempted suicide, he turned his life over to God and began to do shows again, editing the lyrics to many of his songs and considerably cleaning up his stage show.
 
The next few years went by with a few singles and some sporadic tour dates on the Chittlin' circuit. In 2010, Sears won a Soul Patrol "best of" in the Slow Jam category for his digital-single "You Betrayed Me". In November of that year he released his most successful single to date "Dirty Dancer" which fared well on the Southern soul charts, hitting number one in several markets. Sears was nominated for Soul Blues Music Award for "Best New Artist".

So Many Roads
Sears began to embrace the neo-soul and urban Adult Contemporary Rhythm and Blues (R&B) sound with the release of the low-profile single "Can't Get You Out of My System" in early 2011. By this time Sears had devoted much of his time to church. Nothing else was heard from him until early 2012 when he released "With Every Beat of My Heart". Sears continued writing and recording new songs and performing locally but dedicated most of his time to preaching while also doing session work, appearing as the featured guitarist on Anakarenn's debut album as well as production work on Black Zack's Southern Soul Radio album, and producing and mentoring local artists. In 2015 he toured as a bassist for Blowfly and played keyboards and guitar on his final album, 77 Rusty Trombones. Later that year he began working with Timmy Thomas as a multi-instrumentalist and opening act. Sears is currently in production on a new EP titled 'So Many Roads'.

Gear
In the studio Sears uses a plethora of guitars, amps and effects. He plays a Gibson B.B. King Lucille Signature ES-335, an assortment of Squier Stratocasters, an Epiphone Les Paul, Epiphone SG, and a few Harmony electric guitars however, he most notably is known for playing the Fender Buddy Guy Stratocaster, a guitar he has owned since he was 12 years old. He plays through an amp chain of a Fender Hot Rod Deville, Marshall JCM 2000 and a Dean Markley K-20 amp to get his signature sound.

Discography

Albums
Transitions (2005)
Blues Power (2006)
Southern Soul, Florida Style (2006)
Get Up on It (2007)
Sweet Thang (unreleased)
So Many Roads (forthcoming EP)  
A Season In Hell (2020)

Singles
"Mellow Down Easy" (2005)
"Crosscut Saw" (2005)
"I Had My Chance" (2005)
"Show Me What You're Working With" (2006)
"Back That Thang Up" (2007)
"Sweet Thang" (2007)
"Dip My Dipper" (2007)
"She Made A Freak Out of Me" (2007)
"You Caught Me with My Drawers Off" (2008)
"Bounce That Booty" (2009)
"Prisoner of Love" (2009)
"I Can't Find A Love" (2009)
"Bigg Poppa" (2010)
"You Betrayed Me" (2010)
"Dirty Dancer" (2010)
"Can't Get You Out of My System" (2011)
"With Every Beat of My Heart" (2012)

References

External links
 

1991 births
Living people
21st-century American guitarists
African-American Christians
African-American guitarists
21st-century African-American male singers
African-American rock singers
African-American male singer-songwriters
Lead guitarists
Slide guitarists
American blues guitarists
American blues singers
American funk guitarists
American funk singers
American male pop singers
American multi-instrumentalists
American rhythm and blues guitarists
American rock guitarists
American rock songwriters
American male guitarists
American soul singers
American tenors
Blues musicians from Florida
Blues rock musicians
Musicians from Fort Lauderdale, Florida
Singer-songwriters from Florida
Guitarists from Florida